John Ferguson (c. 1777—September 5, 1832) was an American attorney and politician from New York City. A Democratic-Republican, and later a Democrat, he was most notable for his service as the 52nd Mayor of New York City from March to June 1815, Grand Sachem of Tammany Hall, and Naval Officer of the Port of New York.

Biography
Ferguson was born c. 1777.

Ferguson graduated from Columbia University in 1795, studied law, and became an attorney.  He was active in politics as a Democratic-Republican, and became a political opponent of Dewitt Clinton.

He worked his way through the ranks to become leader, or Grand Sachem, of Tammany Hall. In 1813, he was appointed Naval Officer of the Port of New York, a lucrative federal position, in which he served until his death.

In March, 1815 he was appointed mayor of New York City. President James Monroe requested that Ferguson choose which office he preferred to hold, and resign the other. Ferguson resigned as mayor in June 1815, enabling Jacob Radcliff to become mayor. From 1830 to 1832, Ferguson was a trustee of Columbia College.

Ferguson died in New York City on September 5, 1832.

Family
Ferguson's daughter Louisa (1807-1845) was the wife of Robert Walter Weir.  He was the grandfather of John Ferguson Weir, son of Robert and Louisa (Ferguson) Weir.

Notes

References
James Grant Wilson, The Memorial History of the City of New-York: From Its First Settlement to the Year 1892, New York History Co., 1893 (Google Books), from Stanford University Library, p. 208 and p. 298 (footnote)

1770s births
1832 deaths
19th-century American politicians
Columbia College (New York) alumni
New York (state) lawyers
New York (state) Democratic-Republicans
New York (state) Democrats
Mayors of New York City
Year of birth uncertain